ATM is an Indian Telugu-language crime heist thriller set in Hyderabad, starring VJ Sunny, Krishna Burugula, Ravi Raj, Roiel Shree, Divi Vadthya, Divya Vani, and Prudhvi Raj. The series is directed by C Chandra Mohan while the story is penned by Harish Shankar, and produced by Dil Raju under the Dil Raju Productions banner, a subsidiary wing of Sri Venkateswara Creations. It has music by Prashanth R Vihari, cinematography by Monic Kumar G, and dialogues by Vijay Muthyam and CP Emmanuel. The series follows four youngsters from the slums of Hyderabad, who rob for their livelihood. They get trapped in a high-profile case and are named most-wanted accused. The series is scheduled to stream on ZEE5 from 20 January 2023.

Plot 
Jagan, Karthik, Abhay and Harsha are four streetsmart youngsters who live in the slums of Hyderabad and are often involved in petty thefts to earn their bread and live a happy life. One day fate forces the four of them to attempt that one big robbery that changes their life and fate forever and in this attempt their paths cross with a strict and ruthless cop called Hegde and a political leader named Gajendra, both of them eyeing their loot. How do the four guys save themselves and how do they escape from the hunt of Hegde forms the story of ATM.

Cast 

Subbaraju: Hegde
VJ Sunny: Jagan 
Divi Vadthya: Ramya Nayak 
Prudhvi Raj: Gajendra 
Krishna Burugula: Karthik 
Ravi Raj: Abhay 
Roiel Shree: Harsha 
Divya Vani: CI Uma Devi 
Shafi: Mentor
Dayanand Reddy: Jagan's father

Release 
In early 2022, ZEE5 announced a slate of Telugu series and films, with ATM being one of them, scheduled for a release on 20 January 2023.

The teaser of the series was released on 8 January 2023.

The makers unveiled the first look teaser through social media platforms on 16 August 2022 and an official trailer on 11 January 2023 which shows that "Jagan leads a dangerous lifestyle. He makes a living stealing money from other people, alongside his three underdog travelling companions. Whatever the reason, their propensity for shortcuts eventually puts them in danger."

References

External links 

 
 ATM on ZEE5

Hindi-language web series